The Other Me is a 2000 Disney Channel Original Movie about a teenager who accidentally clones himself as a genius and ends up using his clone to pass school. The movie is the 23rd Disney Channel Original Movie and is based on the book Me Two by Mary C. Ryan.

Plot
Will Browning is a student who does not perform well in school. His father says that if Will does not improve soon, he will be spending the summer at Camp Spartacus, a boot camp for boys which will help him learn responsibility and discipline. To make up for the grades, Will orders a science project from an organization, "Ocean Pups."

Two scientists, Victor and Conrad, who work there want to move out and work in a "real" lab. They make a breakthrough when they create a process of cloning they call "hyper-cloning". But when they leave, a cloned lab mouse escapes, and their cat chases it all over the lab. It then accidentally knocks over the cloning formula, which drips through a crack in the floor and all over an "Ocean Pups" kit. When Victor and Conrad find out about Will ordering the kit, they decide to spy on the house and take the possible clone back to the lab for experimentation.

While working with the kit, Will accidentally clones himself after stirring the water with his comb that has his hair on it that contains his DNA. While the clone reads Will's science book, he rapidly learns from it, so Will decides to let the clone go to school as Will instead of a science project while Will secretly stays home. When the clone (named Twoie) goes to school, he does not act exactly like Will. At lunch, he enjoys eating pizza for the first time and dances with everyone else; he ends up going to the principal's office for causing a commotion and makes amends with Will's old rival, Scotty DeSota.

Twoie starts getting better grades (it was demonstrated throughout the movie that Will is smart, but he does not try). Furthermore, Twoie has become bolder to try things that Will could never do. When the family visits Will's catatonic grandfather, Mordechai, who never talks to anybody, Twoie asks if being old hurts. Mordechai simply replies, "Not today." They talk and catch up for a long time.

When Twoie tells Will about school and Mordechai, Will starts missing school and his friends. One day, Will is so jealous of Twoie that Will decides to go to school himself. When he gets there, he sees what a reputation he has now. His peers (including the cheerleaders) would greet Will, and DeSota invited him to a baseball game. When his so-called girlfriend asks if he would like to go to the dance, he nervously agrees.

Victor and Conrad keep an eye on Will's house and find out that Will hyper-cloned himself. They mistakenly think that Twoie going to the dance is the real Will Browning. While the real Will spies on them, he finds that Twoie has only a few hours before he turns into Ocean Pup eggs, as clones have a four-week lifespan. He grabs a mixture that will save Twoie, but Victor and Conrad spot Will and mistake him for Twoie.

During the dance, Twoie suddenly feels weak and goes to the bathroom after promising that he will show his friends a new dance move; getting weaker, he tells himself that it is time to leave. When Will arrives, his best friend, Chuckie, asks him how he changed his clothes so fast. Will explains that he cloned himself, but Chuckie does not believe him. Suddenly, Victor and Conrad kidnap Will and take him to the warehouse, thinking Will is the clone.

Twoie comes and rescues him, having learned his location from the telepathic connection they share, and helps him keep the scientists down. Victor and Conrad are defeated by Chuckie and Scotty, who show up to help Twoie and Will after having been alerted by Twoie. They apparently called the cops as well, as they arrive soon afterward, along with Will's parents.

Twoie is dying, but Will is able to feed him the mixture he took from the scientists that gives him a normal lifespan. Will explains everything to his family, and the scientists are arrested. The cops get suspicious, but Will makes up a story that Twoie is his identical cousin Gil Pupman from Belgium, and everyone (except for the scientists) back him up, despite being shocked. The only ones who know the truth are Will, his family, Twoie, Chuckie, Scotty, Will's grandfather, Victor, and Conrad. Will renames Twoie "Gil" and the family adopts him, promising to not let anyone else know. The film ends with Gil asking to have pizza for dinner, and the family wholeheartedly agrees.

Cast
 Andrew Lawrence as Will Browning / Gil Pupman "Twoie"
 Scott McCord as Victor
 Joe Grifasi as Conrad
 Alison Pill as Allana Browning
 Brenden Jefferson as Chuckie
 Tyler Hynes as Scottie DeSota
 Sarah Gadon as Heather Johnson
 Mark L. Taylor as Patrick Browning
 Lori Hallier as Kathryn Browning
 Robert Buck as Grandpa Mordechai
 Andrea Garnett as Miss Pinkerson
 Joseph Motiki as V.J.

Music
"Crucial Part 2"
Written by Stanley A. Smith

"Winners Circle"
Written by Stanley A. Smith

"You Can Do It"
Written by Stanley A. Smith & J.A. Manges

Performed by The Sha Shees
(This song is also featured on the soundtrack to the 1997 Disney film, Jungle 2 Jungle.)

"In the Stream"
Written by Stanley A. Smith

"Everything (Feels Like New)"
Written by Sandy Howell & Michael Benghial

Performed by Alexz Johnson

"Bringin' Da Noise"
Written by Veit Renn & J.C. Chasez

Performed by *NSYNC
(originally from *NSYNC's 2000 album, No Strings Attached.)

"I Dream of You"
Written by Dave Keffer & Mark Carter

Performed by KEF

"Life Is A Party"
Written by Andy Goldman, Jamie Houston & James Dean Hicks

Performed by Aaron Carter

"Just Can't Wait"
Written and Performed by Jamie Dunlap & Scott Nickoley

"I Feel Strange"
Written by Bobby Sandstrom

Performed by Maureen Steel

Awards

Young Artist Awards (2001)

Won
Best Performance in a TV Movie (Comedy) – Leading Young Actor
Andrew Lawrence
Best Performance in a TV Movie (Comedy) – Supporting Young Actor
Tyler Hynes

Nominated
Best Ensemble in a TV Movie
Andrew Lawrence, Brenden Jefferson, Tyler Hynes, Sarah Gadon, and Alison Pill

References

External links

Disney Channel Original Movie films
American television films
2000 television films
2000 films
Films about cloning
Films directed by Manny Coto
Films scored by Mark Mothersbaugh
American teen comedy films
American science fiction comedy films
Films shot in Toronto
2000s American films